Imtiaz Hossain (born 24 February 1985) is a first-class and List A cricketer from Bangladesh.

A right-handed batsman and off-break bowler, he made his debut for Sylhet Division in 2001–02. His highest first-class score is 154 for Sylhet Division against Rajshahi Division in 2015–16.  His best spell with the ball, 3 for 50, came against Khulna Division in 2001–02. His highest List A score is 124 for Sylhet Division against Barisal Division and his best List A bowling figures are 4 for 22 against Chittagong Division in 2001–02.

References

External links
 

1985 births
Living people
People from Sylhet
Bangladeshi cricketers
Sylhet Division cricketers
Sylhet Strikers cricketers
Prime Doleshwar Sporting Club cricketers
Brothers Union cricketers
Kala Bagan Krira Chakra cricketers
Bangladesh East Zone cricketers
Khulna Division cricketers